The 2021 European U17 Badminton Championships took place in Podčetrtek, Slovenia between 3 and 12 September 2021. The championships was composed of two parts: the team championship, and the 5 disciplines of the individual championships. The event was organized by Badminton Europe with the Badminton Association of Slovenia as the host organiser.

Medals

Medal summary
Team Championships

Individual events

Medal table

References

External links
Official website

U17
European U15 Badminton Championships
Badminton
International sports competitions hosted by Slovenia
2021 in Slovenian sport
European Badminton U17 Championships